Peekawoo was a dating application launched in September 2013. It was described as "a dating app made for women that emphasises fun and companionship - and nothing more."

The peekawoo.com website appeared to be down on July 16, 2018 The app's Facebook page was last updated in February 2017.

References

External links

Online dating services of the Philippines
Application software
Philippine brands